HKU may refer to:
 University of Hong Kong
 HKU station, a metro station near the University of Hong Kong
 Hsing-Kuo University, the former name of CTBC Business School in Tainan, Taiwan
 Hungkuang University, in Taichung, Taiwan
 Utrecht School of the Arts